The Croatian Women's First Football League (Croatian: Prva hrvatska nogometna liga za žene, also known as Prva HNLŽ or 1. HNLŽ) is the top women's football league in Croatia. The league was formed in 1992 following the dissolution of the Yugoslav First Women's League, and it currently features 8 clubs. League winners qualify for the UEFA Women's Champions League.

List of winners
Key

Performance by club

References

External links
Federation website
League at UEFA
women.soccerway.com

      
Women
Top level women's association football leagues in Europe
Sports leagues established in 1992
1
1992 establishments in Croatia
Professional sports leagues in Croatia